Payne-Gaposchkin could refer to:
 Cecilia Payne-Gaposchkin, 1900-1979, astronomer
 2039 Payne-Gaposchkin, an asteroid discovered in 1974, named after Cecilia Payne-Gaposchkin